The 2019–20 CSA 3-Day Provincial Cup was a first-class cricket competition that took place in South Africa from October 2019 to April 2020. On 16 March 2020, Cricket South Africa suspended all cricket in the country for 60 days due to the COVID-19 pandemic. On 24 March 2020, Easterns and KwaZulu-Natal were named as the joint-winners of the tournament. KwaZulu-Natal finished top of group B, with Easterns named joint-winners despite not topping their group, but played one match fewer than other teams, with their victory coming via an average points calculation. This was following the recommendations made by Graeme Smith, the acting Director of Cricket.

The competition was played between the thirteen South African provincial teams. In previous editions of the competition, Namibia had also competed, but they withdrew ahead of the start of the previous tournament, citing issues around costs and logistics.

Unlike its counterpart, the CSA Franchise 4-Day Cup, the matches were three days in length instead of four. The tournament was played in parallel with the 2019–20 CSA Provincial One-Day Challenge, a List A competition which featured the same teams. Eastern Province and Northerns were the defending champions, after the title was shared.

On 17 October 2019, in the match between Gauteng and Boland, Lauren Agenbag became the first woman to stand as an on-field umpire in a first-class cricket match in South Africa. In January 2020, Andrea Agathangelou and Yaseen Valli made an opening partnership of 485 runs for Easterns against Boland, breaking the previous record in a first-class match in South Africa of 424 runs set in the 1926–27 season.

Points table

Pool A

Pool B

Fixtures

October 2019

November 2019

December 2019

January 2020

February 2020

March 2020

Final

References

External links
 Series home at ESPN Cricinfo

South African domestic cricket competitions
CSA 3-Day Provincial Cup
2019–20 South African cricket season
CSA 3-Day Provincial Cup
CSA 3-Day Provincial Cup